Merited (Performing) Artist of Ukraine (also translated as Honored (Performing) Artist of Ukraine) is a state honorary title of decoration awarded by the Ukrainian SSR and later Ukraine for outstanding achievement in the performing arts. It is regulated by the Law of Ukraine Regarding the State Awards of Ukraine (#1549-14).

Definition 

The title is the state award of Ukraine that is given for the personal merit by the State of Ukraine to citizens who have worked in their respective economic or socio-cultural fields as a rule for no less than ten (10) years, obtaining high on-the-job achievements and professional mastery.

Conditions 

The title is awarded by the President of Ukraine. It is given to citizens of Ukraine, foreigners, and persons with no citizenship. This title is lower than the People's Artist of Ukraine which can only be awarded ten (10) years after obtaining the Merited Artist of Ukraine. This title is not awarded posthumously. All recipients must have completed Tertiary studies.

The Merited Artist of Ukraine can be awarded to motion picture directors; actors of theatres, films, and circus; singers; members of professional ensembles and chorus'; orchestral conductors; composers; musicians; TV and Radio network broadcasters for their highly executed mastery, creating a highly artistic images, performances, motion movies that became a property of the native culturally artistic heritage.

The recipients are awarded a badge (40 mm high x 30 mm wide, made of silver) and a certificate. The presentation must be conducted publicly.

Recipients
Past recipients include:
 Lidiya Belozyorova
 Rostyslav Derzhypilsky
 Nina Herasymova-Persydska
 Tina Karol
 Alla Kudlai
 Ani Lorak
 Sergei Polusmiak
 Oleksandr Ponomaryov
 Oleksandr Semchuk
 Oksana Shvets (1996)
 Alexandr Stoyanov
 Evgeniy Svetlitsa

See also 

 People's Artist of the USSR
 People's Artist of Ukraine
 Merited Artist (disambiguation)
 List of European art awards

References

External links 
 The document About the State Awards of Ukraine 

 01
Ukrainian art awards
Honorary titles of Ukraine